Lars Patrick Dousa (born July 1, 1992) is an American floorball player who plays as a forward. He has won two caps for the United States national floorball team. Born in the United States, he also holds a Swedish citizenship.

Early life 
Born in Dallas, Texas to Swedish parents, Dousa moved to Stockholm, Sweden with his family in 1996. Growing up in northern Stockholm, he picked up the sport of floorball and represented the local floorball club Åkersberga IBF all the way from the youth teams to the senior team. In 2013, he returned to the United States to attend Wilmington College in Wilmington, Ohio as a marketing major.

Floorball career 
In November 2013, Dousa was called up to the United States national floorball team for their 2014 World Floorball Championships qualifying campaign after impressing national team scouts at a floorball tournament in Westchester, New York. He made his full international debut for the United States on January 31, 2014 in a World Championship qualifier against Jamaica, scoring one goal and providing one assist in a 27–0 win. He won his second cap on February 2, 2014 in a qualifier against Canada, helping the United States clinch a spot at the 2014 World Floorball Championships through a 5–2 win. Despite contributing to United States' qualification for the World Championship, he was not selected for the final tournament held in Gothenburg, Sweden in December 2014.

In 2015, Dousa helped the Dallas-based floorball team the Lonestar Lions win the 2015 Lonestar Invitational Floorball Tournament (LIFT) in Arlington, Texas, playing alongside future United States international Matt Nunez.

Career statistics

International 

 Scores and results list United States' goal tally first, score column indicates score after each Dousa goal.

Honors 
Lonestar Lions
 Lonestar Invitational Floorball Tournament (LIFT): 2015

References 

1992 births
Living people
Floorball players
American floorball players
Swedish floorball players
Wilmington College (Ohio) alumni
West Texas A&M University alumni